The Trading Path (a.k.a. Occaneechi Path, The Path to the Catawba, the Catawba Road, Indian Trading Path, Unicoi Turnpike, Warriors' Path, etc.) is not simply one wide path, as many named historic roads were or are.  It was a corridor of roads and trails between the Tsenacommacah or Chesapeake Bay region (mainly the Petersburg, Virginia area) and the Cherokee, Catawba, and other Native-American countries in the Piedmont region of North Carolina, South Carolina, and Georgia.  Indigenous folks had used and maintained much of the path for their expansive trading network for centuries prior to its use by Europeans and/or European-Americans. Native and later European/European-American settlements occupied key points along the path. That section of the Trading Path through the Carolina piedmont was also known as the Upper Road, and a portion between North Carolina and Georgia was called the Lower Cherokee Traders Path.

Both Natives and newcomers mainly used the Trading Path for commercial cargo carriage. In early colonial times, Virginian traders used the path to travel to Native American towns in the Waxhaws. They led long pack caravans of horses carrying "loads of guns, gunpowder, knives, jewelry, blankets, and hatchets, among other goods", and travel southwest to Indigenous villages along the journey to the Waxhaws region, in the vicinity of present-day Mecklenburg County.  They exchanged European goods for furs and deerskins.

Because the path was well laid out through the complex geography of the piedmont area, connecting fords of many streams, it was roughly followed by the 19th-century railroad.  Later, engineers who designed Interstate 85 followed much of this route again from Petersburg, Virginia, to roughly the Georgia state border.  Many of the earliest towns along its route remain to this day.  Many remnants of the Trading Path are still visible.

The Piedmont Urban Crescent essentially has developed along the Trading Path, and since the late 19th century has had steady growth.  It is a spine of polycentric urban development in North Carolina. Cities of the Crescent are the centers of government, finance, education and research, and business in the state.

References

External links
 The Trading Path Association
 Colonial Trading Path historical marker
 Famous Indian Trail historical marker
 Hightower (Etowah) Trail historical marker
 Indian War Trail historical marker
 Sandtown Trail historical marker
 The Unicoi Turnpike historical marker

Native American trails in the United States
Historic trails and roads in Virginia
Historic trails and roads in North Carolina
Historic trails and roads in South Carolina
Historic trails and roads in Georgia (U.S. state)
Native American history of Virginia
Native American history of North Carolina
Native American history of South Carolina
Native American history of Georgia (U.S. state)